The Comeback Tour was a headlining tour by American country music group the Zac Brown Band. It began on August 5, 2021, in Holmdel, New Jersey and finished on November 21, in Rapid City, South Dakota. The tour comes after canceling their 2020 Roar With the Lions Tour due the COVID-19 pandemic.

Background
The band was set to tour in 2020 but because of the COVID-19 pandemic it was canceled. On May 10, 2021, they announced a new tour, The Comeback Tour. Of the tour Brown said, "We couldn't be more excited to get back on the road and share our new music with our fans. It's been a long difficult year for everyone and we're fired up to be reuniting with our crew, get back on tour, and celebrate a brand new world." Most of the tour will take place on the East Coast with some shows in the Midwest and Colorado.

The September 30–October 3 shows were canceled due to Zac Brown testing positive for COVID-19.

Critical reception
Rick Munroe of Music Fest News said of the West Palm Beach show, "The continuous bursts of sound that filled the venue could be felt from those lucky enough to be in the pit and front rows through the upper reaches of the lawn where many fans watched the show from the massive video screens." He also said "It was a night of feel-good, sing-out-loud and don't-care-who's-listening kind of music."

Setlist
This setlist is a representation of the West Palm Beach, Florida show. It does not represent all concerts for the duration of the tour.
"Homegrown"
"Toes"
"Slow Burn"
"Big Love" 
"Goodbye in Her Eyes"
"Keep Me in Mind"
"Same Boat"
It's Not OK"
"Sweet Annie"
"Tomorrow Never Comes"
"As She's Walking Away"
"The Devil Went Down to Georgia" 
"Old Love Song"
"Colder Weather"
"Hard to Handle" 
"Knee Deep"
"Beautiful Drug"
Encore
"Black Betty"/"I Want You to Want Me"/"Two Tickets to Paradise"/"In the Air Tonight"/"La Bamba"/"Come Together"/"Jump"/"What's Up" 
"Rocket Man" 
"Stubborn Pride"
"Chicken Fried"

Opening acts

Ashland Craft
Gabby Barrett
Adam Doleac

Devin Dawson
Caroline Jones
Teddy Swims

Tour dates

Canceled shows

References

2021 concert tours
Zac Brown Band concert tours